The 2009 PartyPoker.com Grand Slam of Darts was the third staging of the darts tournament, the Grand Slam of Darts organised by the Professional Darts Corporation. The event took place from 14 to 22 November 2009 at the Wolverhampton Civic Hall, Wolverhampton, England. Television coverage of the tournament was covered by ITV Sport, with live coverage on ITV4 and highlights on ITV1.

Despite being beaten by Vincent van der Voort in the group stages, Phil Taylor won a third consecutive Grand Slam with a 16–2 victory over Scott Waites, who became the first BDO player to reach the final of this tournament.

Prize money
The prize fund increased to £400,000 for the 2009 edition of the tournament, an increase of £44,000 from the 2008 edition, £10,000 more for the runner up, £5,000 more for the semi finalists and £2,500 more for the quarter finalists. Players who failed to make it past the group stage in the last tournament got £4,000. However, players who finished 3rd would earn £1,000 more but players who finished bottom of a group would get £1,500 less. Also the player with the highest checkout would not be rewarded. Instead, the group winners would earn £2,500.

Qualifying
There were numerous tournaments that provided qualifying opportunities to players. Most tournaments offered a qualifying position for the winner and runner-up of the tournament, however the World Championships and the Grand Slams offers a place in the tournament to all semi-finalists. There are also various other ways of qualifying for overseas players, including those from Australia and the United States, as well as a wildcard qualifying event open to any darts player. Some minor changes were made to the qualifying criteria from 2008. The winner and the runner-up of the 2009 Championship League Darts would be invited, whilst it was announced that only the winner of the 2008 World Masters would be invited (though runner-up Scott Waites was invited anyway due to the withdrawal of Martin Adams). It was also announced that the winner of the 2009 US Open would be invited, though this was later withdrawn from the qualification criteria.

Qualifying tournaments

PDC

BDO

Other Qualifiers

Pools

Draw

Group stages
all matches first-to-5/best of 9.NB in Brackets: Number = Seeds; BDO = BDO Darts player; Q = QualifierNB: P = Played; W = Won; L = Lost; LF = Legs for; LA = Legs against; +/- = Plus/minus record, in relation to legs; Average = 3-dart average; Pts = Points

Group A

14 November

15 November

17 November

Group B

14 November

15 November

17 November

Group C

14 November

15 November

17 November

Group D

14 November

15 November

17 November

Group E

15 November

16 November

18 November

Group F

15 November

16 November

18 November

Group G

15 November

16 November

18 November

Group H

15 November

16 November

18 November

Nine-dart shootout
With Andy Hamilton and James Wade finishing level on points and leg difference, a nine-dart shootout between the two took place, to see who would play Terry Jenkins in the second round. The match took place after the conclusion of the group stages. The shootout occurred exactly one year to the day after a similar situation at the 2008 Grand Slam of Darts where Hamilton beat Alan Tabern.

Knockout stages

Statistics

References

External links
PDC.tv Netzone, with results and news
ITV's coverage of the event

Grand Slam of Darts
Grand Slam of Darts
Grand Slam of Darts
Grand Slam of Darts